Sadda may refer to:

 Sadda, Khyber Pakhtunkhwa, a town in Kurram District, KPK
 Sadda, Punjab,  a town and Union Council of Kasur District in Punjab, Pakistan
 Sad-dar, a Persian treatise written as a summary of Zoroastrian beliefs (romanized sadda in some works)

See also
Sada (disambiguation)
Sadeh (disambiguation)